Avoncliff Aqueduct carries the Kennet and Avon Canal over the River Avon and the Bath to Westbury railway, at Avoncliff in Wiltshire, England, about  west of Bradford-on-Avon. It was built by John Rennie and chief engineer John Thomas, between 1797 and 1801. It is a Grade II* listed structure.

During construction, stone from a local quarry was used which split when affected by frost. This caused buttresses to collapse and parts of the structure to need rebuilding. Eventually Bath stone from Bathampton Down was used to ensure greater stability.

The spandrel and wing walls are built in alternate courses of ashlar masonry and rock-faced blocks. The central span sagged soon after it was built and has been repaired many times.

As part of the 20th-century restoration of the canal, the aqueduct was lined with a concrete "cradle" and made watertight in 1980.

Gallery

See also 
Dundas Aqueduct
List of canal aqueducts in Great Britain

References

Kennet and Avon Canal
Bridges completed in 1805
Navigable aqueducts in England
Grade II* listed buildings in Wiltshire
Grade II* listed canals
Grade II* listed bridges in England
1805 establishments in England
Bridges across the River Avon, Bristol